Marks, also spelled Marx, named after Karl Marx, is a town in Saratov Oblast, Russia, located  northeast of Saratov, the administrative center of the oblast. Population: 

It was previously known as Baronsk, Yekaterinenshtadt (until 1920), Marksshtadt (until 1941).

History
It was founded in 1767 as a Volga German community called Baronsk, named so because the Dutchman Ferdinand Baron Caneau de Beauregard, who was a baron, founded the city. It was soon renamed Yekaterinenshtadt (Jekaterinenstadt/Katharinenstadt; 1915 - 1920 Yekaterinograd), after Catherine the Great. In 1918, it was granted town status and in 1920 it was renamed Marksshtadt (Marxstadt), after Karl Marx. In 1941, during the resettlement of Germans, the town was given its present name.

Administrative and municipal status
Within the framework of administrative divisions, Marks serves as the administrative center of Marksovsky District, even though it is not a part of it. As an administrative division, it is incorporated separately as Marks Town Under Oblast Jurisdiction—an administrative unit with the status equal to that of the districts. As a municipal division, Marks Town Under Oblast Jurisdiction is incorporated within Marksovsky Municipal District as Marks Urban Settlement.

References

Notes

Sources

External links

Mojgorod.ru. Entry on Marks 

 
Cities and towns in Saratov Oblast
Nikolayevsky Uyezd (Samara Governorate)
Populated places established in 1767
German communities in Russia
1767 establishments in the Russian Empire
Volga German people